Gjeslingene Lighthouse is a coastal lighthouse in the municipality of Nærøysund in Trøndelag, Norway.

It was established in 1877, was reinforced in 1961 and automated in 1987.

Gjæslingan lighthouse stands on the islet of Haraldsøykråka in the island group Sør-Gjæslingan øya  on the north side of the Foldafjord. The lighthouse also emits a "G" Racon signal.

See also

Lighthouses in Norway
List of lighthouses in Norway

References

External links
 Norsk Fyrhistorisk Forening 

Lighthouses completed in 1877
Lighthouses in Trøndelag
Nærøysund
Vikna
1877 establishments in Norway